Huoshaoyun is a mountain with significant lead-zinc deposit in the disputed region of Aksai Chin in Hetian County in Xinjiang, China. The discovery of the mineral deposit was published in academic journal in 2015 and commercially announced in 2016. The development of the site into a mining operation started in 2017. The mine is owned by Guanghui Energy. It is expected to come online between 2020-2022. It is expected to become world's 7th largest lead-zinc mine.

In 2019, on-site survey discovered nearby mountains to include sufficient deposits to warrant future development.

See also

References

Hotan Prefecture
Lead and zinc mines in China
Aksai Chin